The following is a listing of the jazz pianist Bill Evans' original albums. He recorded over 50 albums as a leader between 1956 and 1980 and also played as a sideman on nearly as many more. He broke new ground in many of his piano trio, duet and solo recordings. Several of those won or were nominated for Grammy Awards.

Discography

As leader

Compilations

As sideman
With Jerry Wald
Jerry Wald and his Orchestra (1953)
Listen to the Music of Jerry Wald (1955)
With Lucy Reed
The Singing Reed (1955)
With Dick Garcia
A Message from Garcia (1955)
With George Russell
The Jazz Workshop (1956)
Brandeis Jazz Festival (1957) with orchestra arranged and conducted by Russell & Gunther Schuller
New York, N.Y. (1959)
Jazz in the Space Age (1960)
With Tony Scott
The Touch of Tony Scott (1956)
The Complete Tony Scott (1956)
The Modern Art of Jazz (1957)
Free Blown Jazz (1957)
My Kind of Jazz (1957)
Golden Moments (1959)
I'll Remember (1959)
Sung Heroes (1959)
With Don Elliot
Tenderly: An Informal Session (Milestone, 1956-7 [2001])
Eddie Costa, Mat Mathews & Don Elliott at Newport (Verve, 1957)
The Mello Sound of Don Elliot (Decca, 1958)
With Joe Puma
Joe Puma Trio and Quartet (1957)
With Charles Mingus
East Coasting (Bethlehem, 1957)
With Jimmy Knepper
A Swinging Introduction to Jimmy Knepper (Bethlehem 1957)
With Sahib Shihab
Jazz Sahib (Savoy, 1957)
With Idrees Sulieman
Roots (New Jazz, 1957) with the Prestige All Stars
With Pepper Adams
The Soul of Jazz Percussion (1960) features 3 tracks by the Donald Byrd-Pepper Adams Sextet with Evans, Paul Chambers, Philly Joe Jones, and Earl Zindars
With Eddie Costa
Guys and Dolls Like Vibes (1958)
With Helen Merrill
The Nearness of You (1958)
With Hal McKusick
Cross Section Saxes (1958)
With Miles Davis
1958 Miles (1958)
Kind of Blue (1959)
Jazz at the Plaza (1973)
At Newport 1958 (2001)
With Michel Legrand
Legrand Jazz (1958)
With Cannonball Adderley
Portrait of Cannonball (1958)
Jump for Joy (1958)
Know What I Mean? (1961)
With Art Farmer
Modern Art (United Artists, 1958)
With Chet Baker
Chet Baker Introduces Johnny Pace (Riverside, 1958) [not credited]
Chet (Riverside, 1959)
Chet Baker Plays the Best of Lerner and Loewe (Riverside, 1959)
With Bill Potts
The Jazz Soul of Porgy and Bess (1959)
With Lee Konitz
Live at the Half Note (Verve, 1959)
Lee Konitz Meets Jimmy Giuffre (Verve, 1959) with Jimmy Giuffre
You and Lee (Verve, 1959)
With Warne Marsh
The Art of Improvising (Revelation, 1959 [1974])
With Manny Albam/Teo Macero
Something New, Something Blue (1959)
With John Lewis
Odds Against Tomorrow (1959)
Jazz Abstractions (1960) – with Gunther Schuller & Jim Hall
With Frank Minion
The Soft Land of Make Believe (1960)
With Kai Winding
The Great Kai & J. J. (1960) with J. J. Johnson
The Incredible Kai Winding Trombones (1960)
With Oliver Nelson
The Blues and the Abstract Truth (Impulse!, 1961)
With Mark Murphy
Rah! (1961)
With Dave Pike
Pike's Peak (Epic, 1962)
With Tadd Dameron
The Magic Touch (Tadd Dameron album) (Riverside, 1961)
With Benny Golson
Pop + Jazz = Swing (Audio Fidelity, 1961) – re-mixed version released as Just Jazz!

References

External links
Jazz Discography entries for Bill Evans
[ Discography At Allmusic]
The Bill Evans Memorial Library

 
Jazz discographies
Discographies of American artists